Edward Archdale may refer to:

Sir Edward Archdale, 1st Baronet (1853–1943), Member of Parliament for Fermanagh North, 1898–1903 and 1916–1921
Sir Edward Archdale, 3rd Baronet (1921–2009), Royal Navy officer
Sir (Nicholas) Edward Archdale, 2nd Baronet (1881–1955), of the Archdale baronets